Leason is both a surname and a given name. Notable people with the name include:

Brett Leason (born 1999), Canadian ice hockey player
Jeff R. Leason, American game designer
Nick Leason (born 1968), British racing driver
Percy Leason (1889–1959), Australian cartoonist
Leason Adams (1887–1969), American geophysicist

See also
Leeson, a surname